Sirota's Court is an American television sitcom that aired on NBC on Wednesday nights from December 1, 1976 to April 13, 1977.

Premise
The series centered on Matthew J. Sirota, a night court judge in a large metropolitan city. Others shown were court clerk Maureen O'Connor (with whom Sirota had an on-again-off-again affair), public defender Gail Goodman, District Attorney Bud Nugent, attorney Sawyer Dabney, and Bailiff John Bellson.

Cast
Michael Constantine as Judge Matthew J. Sirota
Cynthia Harris as Maureen O'Connor
Kathleen Miller as Gail Goodman
Fred Willard as D.A Bud Nugent
Ted Ross as Sawyer Dabney
Owen Bush as Bailiff John Bellson

Episodes

References

External links

 

1976 American television series debuts
1977 American television series endings
1970s American sitcoms
1970s American legal television series
1970s American workplace comedy television series
English-language television shows
NBC original programming
Television series by Universal Television
Television shows set in New York City